Schinia cumatilis, the silver-banded gem, is a moth of the family Noctuidae. The species was first described by Augustus Radcliffe Grote in 1865. It is found from the Southwestern United States into Southern Canada.

The wingspan is about 24–27 mm.

The larvae feed on Artemisia frigida.

References

Schinia
Moths of North America
Moths described in 1865

Taxa named by Augustus Radcliffe Grote